Schoenfeld  may refer to:

People
 Aaron Schoenfeld (born 1990), American-Israeli Major League Soccer player 
 Adam Schoenfeld, American poker player
 Bernard C. Schoenfeld, American screenwriter
 Eleonore Schoenfeld, American cellist
 Gabriel Schoenfeld, American politician
 Gerald Schoenfeld (1924-2004), chairman of the Shubert Organization
 Jim Schoenfeld, Canadian ice hockey player
 Lowell Schoenfeld (1920-2002), American mathematician
 Otto Bruno Schoenfeld, athlete
 William N. Schoenfeld (1915-1996), American psychologist

Other uses
 Schoenfeld, Saskatchewan, Canada
 Battle of Schoenfeld, a 1945 battle in Żeńsko in Pomerania, during World War II

See also
 Schönfeld (disambiguation)